Eristalis abusiva is a European species of hoverfly. It is similar to Eristalis arbustorum.

Description
The wings are between 8-9.5 mm in length. The scutellum is shiny. The face covered with pale dust (a narrow black stripe in worn specimens) on the lower part. Arista with the apical half bare and basal half very short-haired. The eyes are pale yellow haired. The male eyes are separated. The tibia are pale black on basal 1/4 or less. Tibia 2 is very pale. 

 
 

The male genitalia are figured by Hippa et al. (2001)   The larva is figured by Hartley (1961).

Distribution
Eristalis abusiva occurs from Palaearctic Fennoscandia and the Faroes (Jensen, 2001) south to North France, from Ireland eastwards through Europe and Russia to the Pacific coast.

Biology
The habitat is wetland, coastal fen and salt-marsh, marsh and fen, raised bog and cutover bog.
Flowers visited include yellow composites, white umbellifers, Calluna vulgaris, Caltha, Cirsium, Erica, Potentilla erecta, Ranunculus, Rubus fruticosus, 
Salix repens, Stellaria, Spartina.

The flight period is beginning May to mid October. The larva is aquatic.

References

Eristalinae
Diptera of Europe
Insects described in 1931